Smith Hall may refer to:
Smith Hall (Georgia Tech)
Smith Hall (University of Alabama)
Smith Hall at LaGrange College, listed on the National Register of Historic Places
Hiram Smith Hall and Annex, listed on the National Register of Historic Places at the University of Wisconsin-Madison
Smith Memorial Hall at the University of Illinois at Urbana-Champaign
Kirby-Smith Hall at Louisiana State University
Smith Hall (Carnegie Mellon University)